Gregory County is one of the 141 Cadastral divisions of New South Wales. It is bordered by Bogan River in the west, and includes the area to the northeast of Nyngan. It includes the Macquarie Marshes Nature Reserve, and the town of Quambone.

Gregory County was named in honour of Surveyor-General and explorer, Sir Augustus Charles Gregory (1819-1905.

Parishes within this county
A full list of parishes found within this county; their current LGA and mapping coordinates to the approximate centre of each location is as follows:

References

Counties of New South Wales